Scopula eunupta is a moth of the family Geometridae. It is found in Russia.

References

Moths described in 1998
eunupta
Moths of Asia